The Sprint was a two-stage, solid-fuel anti-ballistic missile (ABM), armed with a W66 enhanced-radiation thermonuclear warhead used by the United States Army from 1975-1976.

The high temperature caused a plasma to form around the missile, requiring extremely powerful radio signals to reach it for guidance. The missile glowed bright white as it flew.

Sprint was the centerpiece of the Nike-X system, which concentrated on placing bases around large cities to intercept Soviet warheads. The cost of such a system quickly became untenable as the Soviets added more ICBMs to their fleet, and Nike-X was abandoned. In its place came the Sentinel program, which used Sprint as a last-ditch defense against RVs that evaded the much longer-ranged LIM-49 Spartan. Sentinel was itself changed to become the Safeguard Program, which was operational only for a few months from October 1975 to early 1976. Congressional opposition and high costs linked to its questionable economics and efficacy against the then emerging MIRV warheads of the Soviet Union, resulted in a very short operational period.

During the early 1970s, some work was carried out on an improved Sprint II, which was mostly concerned with the guidance systems. These were to be dedicated to the task of protecting the Minuteman missile fields. Further work was canceled as US ABM policy changed.

History

Nike Zeus

The US Army had considered the issue of shooting down theater ballistic missiles of the V-2 missile type as early as the mid-1940s. Early studies suggested their short flight times, on the order of 5 minutes, would make it difficult to detect, track and shoot at these weapons. However, in spite of their much higher performance, intercontinental ballistic missiles' longer flight times and higher trajectories made them, theoretically, much easier to attack.

In 1955, the Army gave Bell Labs, who had developed the earlier Nike missiles, a contract to study the ABM issue. They returned a report saying the concept was within the state of the art, and could be built using modest upgrades to the latest Army surface-to-air missile, the Nike Hercules. The main technological issues would be the need for extremely powerful radars that could detect the incoming ICBM warheads long enough in advance to fire on them, and computers with enough speed to develop tracks for the targets in engagements that lasted seconds.

Bell began development of what became Nike Zeus in 1956, working out of the Nike development center at Redstone Arsenal. The program went fairly smoothly, and the first tests were carried out in the summer of 1959. By 1962, a complete Zeus base had been built on Kwajalein Island and proved very successful over the following year, successfully intercepting test warheads and even low-flying satellites.

New concept

During the period Zeus was being developed, a number of problems arose that appeared to make it trivially easy to defeat. The simplest was that its 1950s-era mechanical radars could track a limited number of targets, and it could be easily overwhelmed by numbers; a report by the Gaither Committee suggested a salvo of four warheads would have a 90% chance of destroying a Zeus base. This was of little concern during early development when ICBMs were enormously expensive, but as their cost fell and the Soviets claimed to be turning them out "like sausages", this became a serious problem.

However, other issues also became obvious in the late 1950s. One issue was that nuclear explosions in space had been tested in 1958 and found that they blanketed a huge area with radiation that blocked radar signals above about  altitude. By exploding a single warhead above the Zeus sites, the Soviets could block observation of following warheads until they were too close to attack. Another simple measure would be to pack radar reflectors in with the warhead, presenting many false targets on the radar screens that cluttered the displays.

As the problems piled up, the Secretary of Defense Neil H. McElroy asked ARPA to study the anti-missile concept. ARPA noted that both the radar decoys and high-altitude explosions stopped working in the thickening lower atmosphere. If one simply waited until the warheads descended below about 60 km, they could be easily picked out on radar again. An extremely high-speed missile would be needed to attack them during this period.

Sprint
The result of the ARPA study came at the height of the debate over the Zeus system in the early 1960s. The new Secretary of Defense, Robert McNamara, convinced President Kennedy that Zeus was simply not worth deploying. He suggested using the funds allocated to its deployment to develop the ARPA system, which became known as Nike-X, a name given by engineering professor Jack Ruina when he was reporting on the concept.

Nike-X required great improvements in radars, computers, and especially the missile. Zeus had an attack profile lasting about a minute; Nike-X's interceptions would last about five seconds.

Sprint II
Work on initial investigations into "Follow-On Sprint" was underway in second-quarter 1968. Los Alamos were examining two warheads for the Upstage II design variation. By third-quarter 1971, Sprint II was incorporated into a new module for Safeguard called Hardsite Defense (HSD) and a joint Atomic Energy Commission/DoD working group was examining new warheads that would require less tritium. HSD was described as:

By first-quarter 1972, the system was renamed Site Defense and its purpose was to defend Minuteman Silos. Over the original Sprint missile, the Sprint II interceptor had slightly reduced launch dispersion, increased hardness to the effect of nuclear weapons, and decreased miss distance. Los Alamos staff expected a request for warhead development sometime in FY-1972-1974. A Phase 2 feasibility study report was completed by Los Alamos in third-quarter 1972 and investigations into warhead design continued into first-quarter 1973.

It is unclear when Sprint II was cancelled, however a report on Sprint II electrical connectors was published in April 1977.

Design
The conical Sprint was stored in and launched from a silo. To make the launch as quick as possible, the missile which was ejected by an explosive-driven piston simply blasted through the fiberglass silo cover. As the missile cleared the silo at 0.6 seconds, the first stage fired and the missile was tilted toward its target. The first stage was exhausted after only 1.2 seconds, but produced  of thrust. On separation, the spent first stage disintegrated due to aerodynamic forces. The second stage fired within 1 to 2 seconds of launch. Interception at an altitude of  took at most 15 seconds.

The first stage's Hercules X-265 engine is believed to have contained alternating layers of zirconium "staples" embedded in nitrocellulose powder, followed by gelatinizing with nitroglycerine, thus forming a higher thrust double-base powder.

The Sprint was controlled by ground-based radio command guidance, which tracked the incoming reentry vehicles with phased array radar and guided the missile to its target.

The Sprint was armed with an enhanced radiation nuclear warhead with a yield reportedly of a few kilotons, though the exact number has not been declassified. The warhead was intended to destroy the incoming reentry vehicle primarily by neutron flux.

The first test of the Sprint missile took place at White Sands Missile Range on 17 November 1965.

Design predecessors

The "HIBEX" (HIgh Boost EXperiment) missile is considered to be somewhat of a design predecessor and competitor to the Sprint missile, as it was a similar high-acceleration missile in the early 1960s, with a technological transfer from that program to the Sprint development program occurring. Both were tested at the White Sands Launch Complex 38. Although HIBEX's initial acceleration rate was higher, at near 400 g, its role was to intercept reentry vehicles at a much lower altitude than Sprint, and it is considered to be a last-ditch anti-ballistic missile "in a similar vein to Sprint". HIBEX employed a star-grain "composite modified double-base propellant", known as FDN-80, created from the mixing of ammonium perchlorate, aluminum, and double-base smokeless powder, with zirconium staples ( in length) embedded or "randomly dispersed" throughout the matrix.

The British "Thunderbird" rocket of 1947 produced an acceleration of 100 g with a polysulfide composite propellant, star-grained cross-section solid rocket motor.

Testing
The first test of the Sprint missile took place at White Sands Missile Range on 17 November 1965.

Survivors
 The Air Defense Artillery museum at Fort Sill, Oklahoma has both Safeguard missiles (Sprint and Spartan), plus Nike Zeus and HIBEX on exhibit.
 The White Sands Missile Range Museum has a HIBEX on exhibit.
 Remote Site Launch Sprint Missile Historic Museum, RSL #3 Missile Site, Cavalier, North Dakota (Full Scale Replica on Display)

Gallery

See also
 53T6
 Anti-ballistic missile
 Surface-to-air missile
 LIM-49 Spartan
 MIM-14 Nike Hercules
 Project Nike
 Safeguard Program

References

Further reading

External links

Sprint

Directory of U.S. Military Rockets and Missiles
Terminal defense using the Sprint
 Sprint missile launch

 Nike Sprint dual launch during a salvo test at Kwajalein Atoll test range
 Video of Nike Sprint launch (2 MB .mpg)
Encyclopedia Astronautica - Sprint
Chapter 9: Sprint Missile Subsystem from ABM Research and development at Bell Labs
Nike Sprint and Spartan Photo Gallery

Anti-ballistic missiles of the United States
Cold War surface-to-air missiles of the United States
Nuclear anti-aircraft weapons
Cold War nuclear missiles of the United States
Missile defense
Abandoned military rocket and missile projects of the United States
Military equipment introduced in the 1970s